William Thomas Simpson (born December 5, 1951) is a former American football defensive back who played professionally in the National Football League (NFL) from 1974 to 1982. Before his NFL career, he played defensive back and punted for Michigan State University and was selected by the Los Angeles Rams in the second round of the 1974 NFL Draft. He was a standout athlete at Royal Oak Shrine High School and was elected to the Archdiocese of Detroit Catholic High School League Hall of Fame in 2007.

Professional career
Simpson played five seasons with the Los Angeles Rams (1974–1978) which culminated in his receiving several postseason awards. He finished his pro career with the Buffalo Bills (1980–1982), retiring with 34 interceptions and 9 more in postseason play.

During the 1981 Wild Card playoff game, played on December 27, 1981 at Shea Stadium, Simpson intercept a pass near the endzone in the closing seconds of the game to preserve a win for the Bills over the New York Jets

Personal life
Simpson is the father of Brett Simpson, a 2009 and 2010 US Open of Surfing champion.

References

External links
 

1951 births
Living people
American football safeties
Buffalo Bills players
Los Angeles Rams players
Michigan State Spartans football players
Players of American football from Detroit